The Munster Junior Football Championship is a gaelic football tournament between the six counties of Munster: Cork, Kerry, Limerick, Tipperary, Clare and Waterford. It is the third-tier county teams playing off in a single-elimination tournament with 2 quarter finals instead of 4 (as of 2014). The cup was first given to the winners in 1957. Kerry have won the most titles, 42 in all.
The winner will play against the champions of the other provinces in the All-Ireland Junior Football Championship.

Roll of Honour

Top winners

List of finals

 1913 Replay ordered after an objection
 1916 Limerick awarded title on an objection after Cork had won the final 1–0 to 0–2

See also
 Leinster Junior Football Championship
 Connacht Junior Football Championship
 Ulster Junior Football Championship

References

External Information

1